Sunlight is an unincorporated community in Washington County, in the U.S. state of Missouri.

History
A post office called Sunlight was established in 1885, and remained in operation until 1927. It is unknown why the name "Sunlight" was applied to this community.

References

Unincorporated communities in Washington County, Missouri
Unincorporated communities in Missouri